Promotora de Informaciones, S.A. (PRISA) is a Spanish media conglomerate headquartered in Madrid, Spain. It is one of the largest media companies in Spain and all of Latin America, producing a wide variety of educational, cultural and informative content. PRISA owns a portfolio of newspapers, magazines, radio stations, and television networks. The majority subsidiaries and brands of the company are El País, Cadena SER, and Santillana.

History and profile
The PRISA group was founded in 1972 by Jesús de Polanco, who was the major shareholder and the president of the company until his death on 21 July 2007. The other founder was José Ortega Spotorno, the son of the philosopher Ortega y Gasset. The company was established as part of the Spanish transition towards democracy. The son of Jesús de Polanco, Ignacio Polanco, succeeded him as the president of PRISA.

The share of the group in the Spanish press market was 15.1% in 2006.

As of 2010 it was controlled by Nicolas Berggruen. At the end of 2010 the US hedge fund Liberty Acquisitions Holdings acquired 51% of the company.

In January 2021, French conglomerate Vivendi acquired a 9.9 percent stake in Prisa.

Holdings

PRISA Media
As of 2012, the company holds a 50% interest in El Huffington Post, the Spanish-language version of the news source.

 Newspapers
 PRISA owns the following papers among the others
 El País: Daily newspaper.
 Diario AS: Sports newspaper.
 Cinco Días: Business newspaper.

 Magazines
 El País Semanal: Sunday magazine.
 ICON: Men's magazine.
 S Moda: Women's magazine.

 Radio
 Cadena SER: News station.
 Los 40: Contemporary hit radio station.
 Los 40 Classic: Classic hits music station.
 Los 40 Dance: Electronic dance music station (Online only).
 Los 40 Urban: Urban hits music station.
 Cadena Dial: Latin pop music station.
 Radiolé: Spanish music station.
 Caracol Radio: News station (Colombia).
 ADN Radio: News station (Chile).
 W Radio: News station (Mexico).

 Internet
 El HuffPost: Web portal.

 Audio
 El País Audio
 AS Audio
 SER Podcast
 Los 40 Podcast
 Dial Podcast
 Podium Podcast

Education
 Grupo Santillana

See also
 Media of Spain
 Books in Spain

References

External links

 
1972 establishments in Spain
Companies based in the Community of Madrid
Mass media companies established in 1972
Companies listed on the Madrid Stock Exchange
Conglomerate companies of Spain
Mass media companies of Spain
Mass media in Madrid
Multinational companies headquartered in Spain